Rhinatrema is a genus of caecilians in the family Rhinatrematidae. Their common name is two-lined caecilians. The genus is known from the Guyanas (Guyana, French Guiana, and Suriname) and adjacent Brazil. Most Rhinatrema are known to inhabit and live in areas of tropical forests where there is an abundance of dense, dead vegetation matter.

Rhinatrema are primitive caecilians that have a true tail. They are oviparous.

Until recently, the two-lined caecilian (R. bivittatum) was the only species in the genus Rhinatrema. However, in 2010 and 2018, new species were described. The genus now contains now six species:

References 

Rhinatrematidae
Amphibians of Brazil
Amphibians of French Guiana
Amphibians of Guyana
Amphibians of Suriname
Taxa named by André Marie Constant Duméril
Taxa named by Gabriel Bibron
Taxonomy articles created by Polbot